Altaf Ali (born 30 June 1944) is a Bangladeshi politician and a former Jatiya Sangsad member representing the Bogra-7 constituency.

Early life
Ali has a law degree and a bachelor's and master's degree in communication.

Career
Ali was elected to the parliament from Bogra-7 as a Jatiya Party candidate in 2014.

References

Living people
1944 births
People from Bogra District
10th Jatiya Sangsad members
Jatiya Party politicians
Place of birth missing (living people)